Alaparthi Sivanagaprasad Chowdary, known professionally as P. A. Arun Prasad, is an Indian film director, screenwriter and producer known for his works in Telugu, Kannada, and Tamil cinema. He has received a Filmfare Award South and a state Nandi Award.

Awards
Nandi Awards
Nandi Award for Best Feature Film (Bronze) - Gowtam SSC (2005)

Filmfare Awards South
Filmfare Award for Best Director - Kannada - Kiccha (2003)

Filmography

As director

As producer

References

External links 
 

Film directors from Hyderabad, India
Filmfare Awards South winners
Nandi Award winners
Living people
1967 births
Telugu film directors
Kannada film directors
21st-century Indian film directors
Screenwriters from Hyderabad, India